Enciclopedia (in Spanish and Italian), or enciclopédia (in Portuguese), means the English word encyclopedia.

Enciclopedia may refer to:

Enciclopedia universal ilustrada europeo-americana  (1908-)
Enciclopedia Italiana or Treccani (1929-)
Enciclopedia Libre Universal en Español (2002-)
Enciclopedia Combi Visual, an encyclopedia edition printed in Barcelona, Spain in 1976 composed of 18 volumes
Grande Enciclopédia Portuguesa e Brasileira (1936-)
Radio Enciclopedia, Cuban radio station